A buckyball or buckminsterfullerene is a molecule resembling a soccer ball composed of 60 carbon atoms.

Buckyball may also refer to:

Truncated icosahedron, the geometric structure of the C molecule
A brand of neodymium magnet toys

See also
 Fullerene, any molecule composed of carbon in the form of a hollow sphere, ellipsoid, tube, and many other shapes